Mario Trevon Austin (born February 26, 1982) is an American former professional basketball player.

College career
Austin played 3 seasons at Mississippi State under head coach Rick Stansbury. He is well known for hitting a clutch 3-point shot in the first 3-point attempt of his career at Mississippi State in a 2002 win over Kentucky. Austin was named second team All-SEC that season (2001–02).

Austin returned to the Bulldogs in 2002–03 and was named first team All-SEC. Austin declared for the 2003 NBA Draft at the season, choosing not to return to Mississippi State for his senior year.

Professional career
After being drafted 36th overall in the 2003 NBA draft by the Chicago Bulls, Austin left to play overseas, starting his professional career with CSKA Moscow, but was released after an injury before playing an official game. Afterwards he signed with the Jackson Rage of the WBA where he spent the remainder of the season.

In 2004, he signed with Italian team Lauretana Biella and in 2005 he was with Hapoel Jerusalem B.C. who got sponsored by billionaire Arkadi Gaydamak shortly before, he quickly became one of the dominant players in the team and led it to the Uleb Cup semi-finals and to the Israeli League Finals

In the summer of 2007, he joined the Bulls for the 2007 NBA Summer League and later, he signed with Benetton Treviso.

On July 18, 2008, Austin signed with Beşiktaş Cola Turka.

At the start of the 2009–10 season, Austin was signed by Meridiano Alicante, but was released on January 21, 2010. On April 10, 2010, Austin was signed by the Atléticos de San Germán of the Puerto Rican league but was waived the next month.

On August 13, 2010, Austin signed with Ukrainian club BC Dnipro. On April 2, 2011, the Bulls traded his draft rights to the Utah Jazz as part of the Carlos Boozer sign-and-trade.

On October 31, 2011, Austin signed with BC Kyiv.

On November 3, 2012 Austin signed with Al Kuwait. On November 9, 2013, he signed with Kuwaiti club Kazma.

On February 3, 2015, Austin signed with KB Peja of the Siguria Superleague and on October 9, Austin signed with Deportivo Valdivia of the Liga Nacional de Básquetbol de Chile (LNB). On November 14, he was waived by Deportivo Valdivia.

Throughout his 12 years of professional basketball, Austin never played in an NBA game. Making him 1 of 11 players from the 2003 NBA Draft Class to never play in the league.

References

External links
 Profile at acb.com
 Profile at legabasket.it

1982 births
Living people
American expatriate basketball people in Chile
American expatriate basketball people in China
American expatriate basketball people in the Dominican Republic
American expatriate basketball people in Iran
American expatriate basketball people in Israel
American expatriate basketball people in Italy
American expatriate basketball people in Kosovo
American expatriate basketball people in Russia
American expatriate basketball people in Spain
American expatriate basketball people in Turkey
American expatriate basketball people in Ukraine
American men's basketball players
Atléticos de San Germán players
Basketball players from Alabama
BC Dnipro players
BC Kyiv players
Beşiktaş men's basketball players
CB Lucentum Alicante players
Centers (basketball)
Chicago Bulls draft picks
Fujian Sturgeons players
Hapoel Jerusalem B.C. players
KB Peja players
Liga ACB players
McDonald's High School All-Americans
Mississippi State Bulldogs men's basketball players
Pallacanestro Biella players
Pallacanestro Treviso players
Parade High School All-Americans (boys' basketball)
PBC CSKA Moscow players
People from Livingston, Alabama
Power forwards (basketball)